Resident Evil 5 is a 2009 third-person shooter video game developed and published by Capcom. It is a major installment in the Resident Evil series, and was announced in 2005—the same year its predecessor Resident Evil 4 was released. Resident Evil 5 was released for the PlayStation 3 and Xbox 360 consoles in March 2009 and for Microsoft Windows in September that year. The plot involves an investigation of a terrorist threat by Bioterrorism Security Assessment Alliance agents Chris Redfield and Sheva Alomar in Kijuju, a fictional region of West Africa. Chris learns that he must confront his past in the form of an old enemy, Albert Wesker, and his former partner, Jill Valentine.

The gameplay of Resident Evil 5 is similar to that of the previous installment, though it is the first in the series designed for two-player cooperative gameplay. It has also been considered the first game in the main series to depart from the survival horror genre, with critics saying it bore more resemblance to an action game. Motion capture was used for the cutscenes, and it was the first video game to use a virtual camera system. Several staff members from the original Resident Evil worked on Resident Evil 5. The PC version was developed by Mercenary Technology.

Resident Evil 5 received a positive reception, despite some criticism for its control scheme. The game received some complaints of racism, though an investigation by the British Board of Film Classification found the complaints were unsubstantiated. Resident Evil 5 was re-released for PlayStation 4 and Xbox One in June 2016. As of September 2022, the original release has sold over 8.5 million units. A special edition of the game and releases on other platforms sold an additional 4.9 million units, bringing the total sales to 13.4 million. It is the best-selling game of the Resident Evil franchise, and the original version remained the best-selling individual Capcom release until March 2018, when it was outsold by Monster Hunter: World. A sequel, Resident Evil 6, was released in 2012.

Plot
In 2009, five years after the events of Resident Evil 4, Chris Redfield, now an agent of the Bioterrorism Security Assessment Alliance (BSAA), is dispatched to Kijuju in West Africa. He and his new partner Sheva Alomar are tasked with apprehending Ricardo Irving before he can sell a bio-organic weapon (BOW) on the black market. When they arrive, they discover that the locals have been infected by the parasites Las Plagas (those infected are called "Majini") and the BSAA Alpha Team have been killed. Chris and Sheva are rescued by BSAA's Delta Team, which includes Sheva's mentor Captain Josh Stone. In Stone's data Chris sees a photograph of Jill Valentine, his old partner, who has been presumed dead after a confrontation with Albert Wesker. Chris, Sheva and Delta Team close in on Irving, but he escapes with the aid of a hooded figure. Irving leaves behind documents that lead Chris and Sheva to marshy oilfields, where Irving's deal is to occur, but they discover that the documents are a diversion. When Chris and Sheva try to regroup with Delta Team, they find the team slaughtered by a BOW; Sheva cannot find Stone among the dead. Determined to learn if Jill is still alive, Chris does not report to headquarters.

Continuing through the marsh, they find Stone and track down Irving's boat with his help. Irving injects himself with a variant of the Las Plagas parasite and mutates into a huge octopus-like beast. Chris and Sheva defeat him, and his dying words lead them to a nearby cave. The cave is the source of a flower used to create viruses previously used by the Umbrella Corporation, as well as a new strain named Uroboros. Chris and Sheva find evidence that Tricell, the company funding the BSAA, took over a former Umbrella underground laboratory and continued Umbrella's research. In the facility, they discover thousands of capsules holding human test subjects. Chris finds Jill's capsule, but it is empty. When they leave, they discover that Tricell CEO Excella Gionne has been plotting with Wesker to launch missiles with the Uroboros virus across the globe; it is eventually revealed that Wesker hopes to take a chosen few from the chaos of infection and rule them, creating a new breed of humanity. Chris and Sheva pursue Gionne but are stopped by Wesker and the hooded figure, who is revealed to be a brainwashed Jill. Gionne and Wesker escape to a Tricell oil tanker; Chris and Sheva fight Jill, subduing her and removing the mind-control device before she urges Chris to follow Wesker.

Chris and Sheva board the tanker and encounter Gionne, who escapes after dropping a case of syringes; Sheva keeps several. When Chris and Sheva reach the main deck, Wesker announces over the ship's intercom that he has betrayed Gionne and infected her with Uroboros. She mutates into a giant monster, which Chris and Sheva defeat. Jill radios in, telling Chris and Sheva that Wesker must take precise, regular doses of a serum to maintain his strength and speed; a larger or smaller dose would poison him. Sheva realizes that Gionne's syringes are doses of the drug. Chris and Sheva follow Wesker to a bomber loaded with missiles containing the Uroboros virus, injecting him with the syringes Gionne dropped. Wesker tries to escape on the bomber; Chris and Sheva disable it, making him crash-land in a volcano. Furious‚ Wesker exposes himself to Uroboros and chases Chris and Sheva through the volcano. They fight him, and the weakened Wesker falls into the lava before Chris and Sheva are rescued by a helicopter, which is piloted by Jill and Stone. As a dying Wesker attempts to drag the helicopter into the volcano, Chris and Sheva fire rocket-propelled grenades at Wesker, killing him. In the game's final cutscene, Chris wonders if the world is worth fighting for. Looking at Sheva and Jill, he decides to live in a world without fear.

Gameplay

Resident Evil 5 is a third-person shooter with an over-the-shoulder perspective. Players can use several weapons including handguns, shotguns, automatic rifles, sniper rifles, and grenade launchers, as well as melee attacks. Players can make quick 180-degree turns to evade enemies. The game involves boss battles, many of which contain quick time events.

As in its predecessor Resident Evil 4, players can upgrade weapons with money and treasure collected in-game and heal themselves with herbs, but cannot run and shoot at the same time. New features include infected enemies with guns and grenades, the ability to upgrade weapons at any time from the inventory screen without having to find a merchant, and the equipping of weapons and items in real-time during gameplay. Each player can store nine items. Unlike the previous games, the item size is irrelevant; a herb or a grenade launcher each occupy one space, and four items may be assigned to the D-pad. The game features puzzles, though fewer than previous titles.

Resident Evil 5 is the first game in the Resident Evil series designed for two-player cooperative gameplay. The player controls Chris, a former member of the fictional Special Tactics and Rescue Service (STARS) and member of the BSAA, and a second player can control Sheva, who is introduced in this game. If a person plays alone, Sheva is controlled by the game's artificial intelligence (AI). When the game has been completed once, there is an option to make Sheva the primary character. Two-player mode is available online or split screen with a second player using the same console. A second player joining a split screen game in progress will make the game reload the last checkpoint (the point at which the game was last saved); the second player joining an online game will have to wait until the first player reaches the next checkpoint, or restarts the previous one, to play. In split-screen mode, one player's viewpoint is presented in the top half of the screen, and the other in the bottom half, but each viewpoint is presented in widescreen format, rather than using the full width of the screen, resulting in unused space to the left and right of the two windows. If one player has critical health, only their partner can resuscitate them, and they will die if their partner cannot reach them. At certain points, players are deliberately separated. Players can trade items during gameplay, although weapons cannot be traded with online players. The game's storyline is linear, and interaction with other characters is mostly limited to cutscenes.

A version of the Mercenaries minigame, which debuted in Resident Evil 3: Nemesis, is included in Resident Evil 5. This minigame places the player in an enclosed environment with a time limit. Customized weapons cannot be used and players must search for weapons, ammunition, and time bonuses while fighting a barrage of enemies, to score as many points as possible within the time limit. The minigame multiplayer mode was initially offline only; a release-day patch needed to be downloaded to access the online multiplayer modes. Mercenaries is unlocked when the game's story mode has been completed.

Development

Resident Evil 5 was developed by Capcom and produced by Jun Takeuchi, who directed Onimusha: Warlords and produced Lost Planet: Extreme Condition. Keiji Inafune, promotional producer for Resident Evil 2 and executive producer of the PlayStation 2 version of Resident Evil 4, supervised the project. Production began in 2005 and at its peak, over 100 people were working on the project. In February 2007, some members of Capcom's Clover Studio began working on Resident Evil 5 while others were working on Resident Evil: The Umbrella Chronicles, which debuted for the Wii. Yasuhiro Anpo, who worked as a programmer on the original Resident Evil, directed Resident Evil 5. He was one of several staff members who worked on the original game to be involved in Resident Evil 5 development. The game's scenario was written by Haruo Murata and Yoshiaki Hirabayashi, based on a story idea by concept director Kenichi Ueda. Takeuchi announced that the game would retain the gameplay model introduced in Resident Evil 4, with "thematic tastes" from both Resident Evil 4 and the original Resident Evil.

While previous Resident Evil games are mainly set at night, the events of Resident Evil 5 occur almost entirely during the day. The decision for this was a combination of the game being set in Africa and advances in hardware improvements which allowed increasingly detailed graphics. On the subject of changes to Jill and Chris's appearance, production director Yasuhiro Anpo explained that designers tried "to preserve their image and imagined how they would have changed over the passage of time". Their new designs retained the character's signature colors; green for Chris and blue for Jill. Sheva was redesigned several times during production, though all versions tried to emphasize a combination of "feminine attraction and the strength of a fighting woman". The Majini were designed to be more violent than the "Ganado" enemies in Resident Evil 4.

The decision for cooperative gameplay was made part-way through development, for a new experience in a Resident Evil game. Despite initial concern that a second player would dampen the game's tension and horror, it was later realized that this could actually increase such factors where one player had to be rescued. The decision to retain wide-screen proportions in two-player mode was made to avoid having the first player's screen directly on top of the second, which might be distracting, and the restriction on simultaneously moving and shooting was retained to increase player tension by not allowing them to maneuver freely. Takeuchi cited the film Black Hawk Down as an influence on the setting of Resident Evil 5 and his experience working on Lost Planet: Extreme Condition as an influence on its development. When questioned as to why the game was not being released on the Wii, which was the most popular gaming console at that time , Takeuchi responded that although that may have been a good decision "from a business perspective", the Wii was not the best choice in terms of power and visual quality, concluding that he was happy with the console choices they had made.

Resident Evil 5 runs on version 1.4 of Capcom's MT Framework engine and scenes were recorded by motion capture. It was the first video game to use a virtual camera system, which allowed the developers to see character movements in real time as the motion-capture actors recorded. Actors Reuben Langdon, Karen Dyer and Ken Lally portrayed Chris Redfield, Sheva Alomar and Albert Wesker respectively. Dyer also voiced Sheva, while Chris's voice was performed by Roger Craig Smith. Dyer's background training in circus skills helped her win the role of Sheva, as Capcom were searching for someone who could handle the physical skills her motion capture required. She performed her own stunts, and worked in production on the game for over a year, sometimes working 14 hours a day. All of the human character motions were based on motion capture, while the non-human characters in the game were animated by hand.

Kota Suzuki was the game's principal composer and additional music was contributed by Hideki Okugawa, Akihiko Narita and Seiko Kobuchi. The electronic score includes 15 minutes of orchestral music, recorded at the Newman Scoring Stage of 20th Century Fox Studios in Los Angeles with the 103-piece Hollywood Studio Symphony. Other orchestral music and arrangements were by Wataru Hokoyama, who conducted the orchestra. Capcom recorded in Los Angeles because they wanted a Hollywood-style soundtrack to increase the game's cinematic value and global interest. Resident Evil 5 soundtrack features an original theme song, titled "Pray", which was composed by Suzuki and sung by Oulimata Niang.

Marketing and release
Capcom announced Resident Evil 5 on July 20, 2005, and the company showed a brief trailer for the game at the Electronic Entertainment Expo (E3) in July 2007. The full E3 trailer became available on the Xbox Live Marketplace and the PlayStation Store that same month. A new trailer debuted on Spike TV's GameTrailers TV in May 2008, and on the GameTrailers website. A playable game demo was released in Japan on December 5, 2008, for the Xbox 360, in North America and Europe for the Xbox 360 on January 26, 2009, and on February 2 for the PlayStation 3. Worldwide downloads of the demo exceeded four million for the two consoles; over 1.8 million were downloaded between January 26 and January 29.

In January 2009, D+PAD Magazine reported that Resident Evil 5 would be released with limited-edition Xbox 360 box art; pictures of the limited-edition box claimed that it would allow two to sixteen players to play offline via System Link. Although Capcom said that their "box art isn't lying", the company did not provide details. Capcom soon issued another statement that the box-art information was incorrect, and System Link could support only two players. Microsoft released a limited-edition, red Xbox 360 Elite console which was sold with the game. The package included an exclusive Resident Evil theme for the Xbox 360 Dashboard and a download voucher for Super Street Fighter II Turbo HD Remix from Xbox Live.

Resident Evil 5 was released for PlayStation 3 and Xbox 360 in March 2009, alongside a dedicated Game Space on PlayStation Home. The space, Resident Evil 5 "Studio Lot" (Biohazard 5 "Film Studio" in Japan), had as its theme the in-game location of Kijuju. Its lounge offered Resident Evil 5-related items for sale, events and full game-launching support. Some areas of the space were available only to owners of Resident Evil 5. A Microsoft Windows version was released in September 2009. This version, using Nvidia's 3D Vision technology through DirectX 10, includes more costumes and a new mode in the Mercenaries minigame. Resident Evil 5 was re-released on Shield Android TV in May 2016, and was re-released on PlayStation 4 and Xbox One the following month, with a physical disc copy following in America that July. It was also released for Nintendo Switch on October 29, 2019.

Additional content
Shortly before the release of Resident Evil 5, Capcom announced that a competitive multiplayer mode called Versus would be available for download in several weeks. Versus became available for download in Europe and North America on April 7, 2009, through the Xbox Live Marketplace and the PlayStation Store. Versus has two online game types: "Slayers", a point-based game challenging players to kill Majini, and "Survivors", where players hunt each other while dodging and attacking Majini. Both modes can be played by two-player teams. The Microsoft Windows version of Resident Evil 5 originally did not support downloadable content (DLC).

During Sony's press conference at the 2009 Tokyo Game Show Capcom announced that a special edition of the game, Biohazard 5: Alternative Edition, would be released in Japan for the PlayStation 3 in the spring of 2010. This edition supports the PlayStation Move accessory and includes a new scenario, "Lost in Nightmares", where Chris Redfield and Jill Valentine infiltrate one of Umbrella Corporation co-founder Oswell E. Spencer's estates in 2006. Another special edition of the game, Resident Evil 5: Gold Edition, was released for the Xbox 360 and PlayStation 3 in North America and Europe. Gold Edition includes "Lost in Nightmares" and another campaign-expansion episode, "Desperate Escape", where players control Josh Stone and Jill Valentine as they assist Chris and Sheva. The edition also includes the previously released Versus mode, four new costumes and an alternate Mercenaries mode with eight new playable characters, new items and maps. Like Alternative Edition, Gold Edition supports the PlayStation Move accessory with a patch released on September 14, 2010. The Xbox 360 version of Gold Edition came in a DVD with a token allowing free download of all DLC, while the PlayStation 3 version had all of the new content on a single Blu-ray disc. On November 5, 2012, Resident Evil 5: Gold Edition was placed on the PlayStation Network as a free download for PlayStation Plus users during that month.

As part of the game's conversion to Steamworks, Gold Edition was released for Microsoft Windows on March 26, 2015. Owners of the game from Steam or as a boxed retail Games for Windows – Live can acquire a free Steamworks copy of the base game and purchase the new Gold Edition content. The Steamworks version did not allow the use of Nvidia's 3D Vision technology or fan modifications, though Capcom later confirmed a way to work around these issues. In 2023, an update was released for the PC version that removed Games for Windows – Live, thus restoring the split screen co-op feature to the game.

Reception

 Resident Evil 5 received generally favourable reviews, according to review aggregator Metacritic. Reviewers praised the game's visuals and content. Corey Cohen of Official Xbox Magazine complimented the game's fast pace, and called the graphics gorgeous. It was praised by Joe Juba and Matt Miller of Game Informer, who said that it had the best graphics of any game to date and that the music and voice acting helped bring the characters to life, and Brian Crecente of Kotaku said it was one of the most visually stunning games he had ever played. Adam Sessler of X-Play said the game's graphics were exceptional, and Edge praised the gameplay as exhilarating and frantic. For IGN, Ryan Geddes wrote that the game had a surprisingly high replay value, and GameZone Louis Bedigian said the game was "worth playing through twice in one weekend".

While still giving favorable reviews of the game, several reviewers considered it to be a departure from the survival horror genre, a decision they lamented. Chris Hudak of Game Revolution considered the game to be a "full-on action blockbuster", and Brian Crecente said that about halfway through the game it "dropp[ed] all pretense of being a survival horror title and unmask[ed] itself as an action shooter title". Kristan Reed of Eurogamer said the game "morphs what was a survival horror adventure into a survival horror shooter", and believed that this attempt to appeal to action gamers would upset some of the series' fans.

Aspects of the game's control scheme were viewed negatively by critics. James Mielke of 1UP.com criticized several inconsistencies in the game, such as only being able to take cover from enemy fire in very specific areas. Mielke also criticized its controls, saying that aiming was too slow and noting the inability to strafe away from (or quickly jump back from) enemies. Despite the problems he found it was "still a very fun game". Kristan Reed also had criticism of some controls, such as the speed at which 180-degree turns were performed and difficulty accessing inventory. Joe Juba said that the inability to move and shoot at the same time seemed more "like a cheap and artificial way to increase difficulty than a technique to enhance tension." While praising some aspects of the AI control of Sheva, Ryan Geddes thought that it also had its annoyances, such as its tendency to recklessly expend ammunition and health supplies.

Reception of the downloadable content was favorable. Steven Hopper of GameZone rated the "Lost in Nightmares" DLC eight out of ten, saying that despite the episode's brevity it had high replay value and the addition of new multiplayer elements made it a "worthy investment for fans of the original game." Samuel Claiborn of IGN rated the "Desperate Escape" DLC seven out of ten: "Despite Desperate Escape's well-crafted action sequences, I actually found myself missing the unique vibe of Lost in Nightmares. The dynamic between Jill and Josh isn't particularly thrilling, and the one-liners, banter and endearing kitsch are kept to a minimum."

Allegations of racism
Resident Evil 5s 2007 E3 trailer was criticized for depicting a white protagonist killing black enemies in a small African village. According to Newsweek editor N'Gai Croal, "There was a lot of imagery in that trailer that dovetailed with classic racist imagery", although he acknowledged that only the preview had been released. Takeuchi said the game's producers were completely surprised by the complaints. The second trailer for the game, released on May 31, 2008, revealed a more racially diverse group of enemies and the African BSAA agent Sheva, who assists the protagonist. Critics felt that Sheva's character was added to address the issue of racism, though Karen Dyer said the character had been in development before the first trailer was released. Takeuchi denied that complaints about racism had any effect in altering the design of Resident Evil 5. He acknowledged that different cultures may have had differing opinions about the trailer, though said he did not expect there to be further complaints once the game was released and people were "able to play the game and see what it is for themselves". In a Computer and Video Games interview, producer Masachika Kawata also addressed the issue: "We can't please everyone. We're in the entertainment business—we're not here to state our political opinion or anything like that. It's unfortunate that some people felt that way."

In Eurogamer February 2009 preview of Resident Evil 5, Dan Whitehead expressed concern about controversy the game might generate: "It plays so blatantly into the old clichés of the dangerous 'dark continent' and the primitive lust of its inhabitants that you'd swear the game was written in the 1920s". Whitehead said that these issues became more "outrageous and outdated" as the game progressed and that the addition of the "light-skinned" Sheva just made the overall issue worse. Hilary Goldstein from IGN believed that the game was not deliberately racist, and though he did not personally find it offensive, he felt that others would due to the subjective nature of offensiveness. Chris Hudak dismissed any allegations of racism as "stupid". Karen Dyer, who is of Jamaican descent, also dismissed the claims. She said that in over a year of working on the game's development she never encountered anything racially insensitive, and would not have continued working there if she had.

Wesley Yin-Poole of VideoGamer.com said that despite the controversy the game was attracting due to alleged racism, no expert opinion had been sought. He asked Glenn Bowman, senior lecturer in social anthropology at the University of Kent, whether he thought the game was racist. Bowman considered the racism accusations "silly", saying that the game had an anti-colonial theme and those complaining about the game's racism might be expressing an "inverted racism which says that you can't have scary people who are black". It was reported that one cutscene in the game scene showed "black men" dragging off a screaming white woman; according to Yin-Poole, the allegation was incorrect and the single man dragging the woman was "not obviously black". The scene was submitted to the British Board of Film Classification for evaluation. BBFC head of communications Sue Clark said, "There is only one man pulling the blonde woman in from the balcony [and he] is not black either. As the whole game is set in Africa it is hardly surprising that some of the characters are black ... we do take racism very seriously, but in this case, there is no issue around racism."

Academic journals and conferences, however, have continued to comment on the theme of race within the game. In 2011, André Brock from Games and Culture said that the game drew from well-established racial and gender stereotypes, saying that the African people were only depicted as savage, even before transitioning into zombies. Writing for the Digital Games Research Association in 2011, Geyser and Tshabalala noted that racial stereotyping had never been intended by Capcom, though compared their depiction of Africa to that of the 1899 novel Heart of Darkness. Post-colonial Africa, they opined, was portrayed as being unable to take care of itself, and at the mercy of Western influences.

Writing for The Philosophy of Computer Games Conference in 2015, Harrer and Pichlmair considered Resident Evil 5 to be "yet another moment in the history of commodity racism, which from the late 19th century onwards allowed popular depictions of racial stereotypes to enter the most intimate spaces of European homes". The authors state that Africa is presented from a Western gaze; "what is presented as 'authentic' blackness conforms to the projected fantasy of predominantly white gaming audience". In 2016, Paul Martin from Games and Culture said that the theme of the game could be described as "dark continent", stating it drew on imagery of European colonialism and depictions of "Blackness" reminiscent of 19th-century European theories on race.

Sales
The PlayStation 3 version of Resident Evil 5 was the top-selling game in Japan in the two weeks following its release, with 319,590 copies sold. In March 2009, it became the fastest-selling game of the franchise in the United Kingdom, and the biggest Xbox 360 and PlayStation 3 game release in the country. By September 2022, Resident Evil 5 had sold 8.5 million copies worldwide between PlayStation 3, Xbox 360 and download, and the Gold Edition had sold an additional 2.3 million copies across those systems. The PlayStation 4 and Xbox One versions sold another 2.6 million copies combined, bringing the total sales to 13.4 million units.

The original release of Resident Evil 5 was Capcom's best-selling individual edition of a game until March 2018, when Monster Hunter: Worlds sales reached 7.5 million units, compared to 7.3 million for Resident Evil 5 at the time. As of June 2020, when taking into consideration the sales of all versions and re-releases of titles, Resident Evil 5 was the third-best-selling Capcom game overall, behind Monster Hunter: World (16.1 million) and Street Fighter II (14.05 million), and it remains the best-selling title in the Resident Evil franchise, outselling its closest rivals Resident Evil 4 and Resident Evil 6 by 1.6 million and 2 million units, respectively.

Awards
Resident Evil 5 won the "Award of Excellence" at the 2009 Japan Game Awards. It was nominated for both Best Action/Adventure Game and Best Console Game at the 2008 Game Critics Awards, Best Action Game at the 2009 IGN Game of the Year Awards, and Best Sound Editing in Computer Entertainment at the 2010 Golden Reel Awards. It received five nominations at the 2010 Game Audio Network Guild Awards: Audio of the Year, Best Cinematic/Cut-Scene Audio, Best Dialogue, Best Original Vocal Song – Pop (for the theme song "Pray") and Best Use of Multi-Channel Surround in a Game. Karen Dyer was nominated for Outstanding Achievement in Character Performance at the 2010 Academy of Interactive Arts & Sciences Awards; the game also received a nomination for Outstanding Achievement in Art Direction.

Notes

References

Bibliography

External links

 

2009 video games
Action-adventure games
Bioterrorism in fiction
Capcom games
Cooperative video games
Fiction about parasites
Games for Windows certified games
Multiplayer and single-player video games
Nintendo Switch games
PlayStation 3 games
PlayStation 4 games
PlayStation Move-compatible games
Race-related controversies in video games
Resident Evil games
Split-screen multiplayer games
Third-person shooters
Video game sequels
Video games developed in Japan
Video games featuring black protagonists
Video games featuring female protagonists
Video games scored by Akihiko Narita
Video games scored by Wataru Hokoyama
Video games set in 2009
Video games set in Africa
Video games set in Europe
Video games set in a fictional country
Video games using Havok
Windows games
Xbox 360 games
Xbox One games
2000s horror video games
Mercenary Technology games